Leonard William Gibbs Jr. (November 8, 1948 – September 15, 2021), also known as Doc Gibbs, was an American percussionist. Gibbs studied at the Pennsylvania Academy of Fine Arts in the early 1970s. He has toured with artists such as Anita Baker, Whitney Houston, Bob James, Ricki Lee Jones, Al Jarreau, Grover Washington, Jr., Wyclef Jean, Erykah Badu, Eric Bennett, and James Poyser. He acquired the nickname "Doc" after suggesting herbal remedies to jazz saxophonist Grover Washington, Jr.

He headed the house band on the Food Network television show Emeril Live hosted by Emeril Lagasse, until it was cancelled in December 2007.

Gibbs died from prostate cancer on September 15, 2021, at the age of 72.

References 

1948 births
2021 deaths
Place of birth missing
African-American musicians
American percussionists
Pennsylvania Academy of the Fine Arts alumni
20th-century African-American people
21st-century African-American people